Craig Wilson (born 24 March 1974) is a South African former cricketer. He played in one List A and eleven first-class matches from 1994/95 to 1999/00.

References

External links
 

1974 births
Living people
South African cricketers
Boland cricketers
Border cricketers
People from Cradock, Eastern Cape
Cricketers from the Eastern Cape